Rogelio Antonio Domínguez López (9 March 1931 – 23 July 2004) was an Argentine football goalkeeper who played for Real Madrid and was part of their European Cup victories in 1959 and 1960. He was in Argentina's squad for the 1962 FIFA World Cup.

Biography

Domínguez was discovered during a match by the cofounder of the famous Club River Plate, Carlos Peucelle, who persuaded Dominguez to begin to train at River Plate in March 1946. He was seventeen years old when he was discovered by delegates of the Racing Club of Avellaneda and he was signed immediately.

In 1957 Domínguez signed for Real Madrid in Spain. After several successful seasons with the club, he returned to South America where he played for River Plate and Vélez Sarsfield in Argentina, and then CA Cerro, Nacional in Uruguay and Flamengo in Brazil.

International career

In 1951 he won the Panamerican Championship playing for the Argentina national football team; to which he'd belonged for 12 years, from 1951 to 1963. He was chosen Best America's Goalkeeper for two consecutive seasons, in 1956 and 1957 and was part of the triumphant team that claimed the 1957 Copa América title.

After playing
After 20 years at the top of worldwide football he quit playing at the age of forty in 1970 and become manager of San Lorenzo, Argentine National Sub-champion in 1971, Chacarita Juniors (1972), Boca Juniors (1973–1975) and many other clubs including Gimnasia de La Plata, Club Atlético Tucumán, Loma Negra, Quilmes and Racing Club.

Domínguez died of a heart attack on 23 July 2004 in the Hospital Penna of the Flores district of Buenos Aires.

External links

European Cup 1958/59 from RSSSF
European Cup 1958/59 from UEFA
European Cup History 1959
 
Terra.com Obituary 

1931 births
2004 deaths
Footballers from Buenos Aires
Argentine footballers
Racing Club de Avellaneda footballers
Real Madrid CF players
Club Atlético River Plate footballers
Club Atlético Vélez Sarsfield footballers
C.A. Cerro players
Club Nacional de Football players
CR Flamengo footballers
La Liga players
Argentine Primera División players
Argentine expatriate footballers
Expatriate footballers in Brazil
Expatriate footballers in Spain
Expatriate footballers in Uruguay
Argentine expatriate sportspeople in Brazil
Argentine expatriate sportspeople in Spain
Argentine expatriate sportspeople in Uruguay
Association football goalkeepers
Argentina international footballers
1962 FIFA World Cup players
Argentine football managers
San Lorenzo de Almagro managers
Chacarita Juniors managers
Boca Juniors managers
Club de Gimnasia y Esgrima La Plata managers
Atlético Tucumán managers
Quilmes Atlético Club managers
Racing Club de Avellaneda managers
Burials at La Chacarita Cemetery
UEFA Champions League winning players
Medalists at the 1951 Pan American Games
Pan American Games gold medalists for Argentina
Pan American Games medalists in football
Footballers at the 1951 Pan American Games